Mount Oberlin is located in the Lewis Range, Glacier National Park in the U.S. state of Montana. Mount Oberlin is just northwest of Logan Pass. Below the summit to the northwest, water and melting snow off Mount Oberlin lead to the  Bird Woman Falls, one of the tallest waterfalls in Glacier National Park.

Dr. Lyman B. Sperry, a member of an 1895 party exploring the Glacier Park region, named the mountain after his employer, Oberlin College.

See also
 Mountains and mountain ranges of Glacier National Park (U.S.)

References

Mountains of Flathead County, Montana
Mountains of Glacier National Park (U.S.)
Lewis Range
Mountains of Montana